Francisco Trujillo Garcia (1519 – 14 November 1592) was a Roman Catholic prelate who served as Bishop of León (1578–1592).

Biography
Francisco Trujillo Garcia was born in Cañicera, Spain in 1519. On 5 September 1578, he was appointed during the papacy of Pope Gregory XIII as Bishop of León. In 1578, he was consecrated bishop by Filippo Sega, Bishop of Piacenza, with Diego de Simancas, Bishop of Zamora, and Diego de la Calzada, Auxiliary Bishop of Toledo, serving as co-consecrators. He served as Bishop of León until his death on 14 November 1592. While bishop, he was the principal co-consecrator of Juan Ruiz Agüero, Bishop of Zamora (1584), and Pedro Castro Quiñones, Archbishop of Granada (1590).

References

External links and additional sources
 (for Chronology of Bishops) 
 (for Chronology of Bishops) 

16th-century Roman Catholic bishops in Spain
1519 births
1592 deaths
Bishops appointed by Pope Gregory XIII